Dream 3: Lightweight Grand Prix 2008 2nd Round was a mixed martial arts event promoted by Fighting and Entertainment Group's mixed martial arts promotion DREAM. The event took place on Tuesday May 11, 2008 at the Saitama Super Arena in Saitama, Japan and hosted the second round of the promotion's  Lightweight tournament.

The evening's main event featured Caol Uno and Mitsuhiro Ishida as well as the last fight of the first round of the Dream middleweight tournament, Katsuyori Shibata vs. Jason "Mayhem" Miller. The event was broadcast live in Japan on SkyPerfect Pay-Per-View, and live in the United States on HDNet Fights.

The Lightweight Champion was crowned at DREAM.5.

Results

Entrance Music
Opening – Another Star / Stevie Wonder vs. Revolater / Dragon Ash
Caol Uno – Smells Like Teen Spirit / Fantastic Plastic Machine Remix
Mitsuhiro Ishida –  Welcome to the Black Parade / My Chemical Romance 
Joachim Hansen – Angel Of Death / Slayer 
Eddie Alvarez –  The Champ Is Here / Jadakiss (version is unclear)
Tatsuya Kawajiri – Water Pow / B-DASH 
Luis Buscape – Harder, Better, Faster, Stronger / Daft Punk (remix)
Katsuya Inoue – Know your enemy / Rage Against The Machine 
Nick Diaz –  Root / Deftones 
Nakamura Daisuke – Wonderfulguys
Jung Bukyung – Exodus / Maksim 
Kim Dae Won – Better Than Yesterday / MC Sniper
Melvin Manhoef – The Battle Hans Zimmer Im A Boss / Young Jeezy Ft Rick Ross 
Jason "Mayhem" Miller – Dance Monkey / Sage Francis 
Katsuyori Shibata – Take Over / LOW-IQ-01 
Yamazaki Takeshi – Ai no Tabi / Sleep Walker
Shoji – Guerilla Radio / Rage Against The Machine

See also 
 Dream (mixed martial arts)
 List of Dream champions
 2008 in DREAM

Notes
 The 8th matchup was initially to be postponed until DREAM.2 due to the injuries of Vítor Ribeiro and Caol Uno along with Gilbert Melendez's prior commitment to Strikeforce. Dream officials have decided to directly seed Caol Uno into the 2nd round against Mitsuhiro Ishida as the 8th fighter.
 The LW Grandprix match between Shinya Aoki and Katsuhiko Nagata took place at DREAM.4 due to the injuries Shinya Aoki incurred in his 1st round match with Gesias Calvancanti.

References

Dream (mixed martial arts) events
2008 in mixed martial arts
Mixed martial arts in Japan
Sport in Saitama (city)
2008 in Japan